Léo Hamon, (12 January 1908 – 27 October 1993, Paris) was a French politician. He was a member of the Popular Republican Movement and the Union for the Defence of the Republic. He was also a member of the fourth district of Essonne, senator of the Seine, a government spokesman and State Secretary of Participation and the Incentive.

References 

1908 births
1993 deaths
Politicians from Paris
Popular Republican Movement politicians
Young Republic League politicians
Democratic Union of Labour politicians
Union of Democrats for the Republic politicians
Government ministers of France
French Senators of the Fourth Republic
Senators of Seine (department)
Deputies of the 4th National Assembly of the French Fifth Republic
Human Rights League (France) members
French Resistance members